Óscar Esteban Granados Maroto (born 25 October 1985) is a Costa Rican footballer who plays as a defensive midfielder for Herediano.

Club career
Granados started his career at local side Cartaginés where he would stay for 7 years. In June 2011 he joined newly promoted Orión, but left them 6 months later for Herediano.

International career
Granados made his debut for Costa Rica in a January 2009 UNCAF Nations Cup match against Panama and has, as of May 2014, earned a total of 12 caps, scoring no goals. He represented his country in 2014 FIFA World Cup qualification matches and was a member of Costa Rican squad for 2014 FIFA World Cup where he was yellow-carded while on the sub's bench in the game against Greece. He played at the 2009 UNCAF Nations Cup as well as at the 2009 CONCACAF Gold Cup.

Personal life
Hailing from Quircot de Cartago, he is a son of Elí Granados and Martiza Maroto and is married to Fiorella Alvarado. His elder brother Michael played professional football with second division side Municipal Osa.

References

External links
 
 Player profile - Herediano
 

1985 births
Living people
People from Cartago Province
Association football midfielders
Costa Rican footballers
Costa Rica international footballers
2009 UNCAF Nations Cup players
2009 CONCACAF Gold Cup players
2014 FIFA World Cup players
2014 Copa Centroamericana players
Copa América Centenario players
C.S. Cartaginés players
C.S. Herediano footballers
Copa Centroamericana-winning players